Vere Vazhi Ille  is a 2015 Malaysian Tamil language horror comedy and the first zombie film in Tamil, written and directed by M.S. Prem Nath. It stars Denes Kumar in the lead role with Jasmine Michael. The film was released on 2 Jul 2015 in Malaysia and Singapore.

Then, the sequel of this movie, Mr. Peyii was released on 9 December 2021.

Plot
Surya is an easygoing laidback guy who constantly switches jobs. One day, he accepts a job from his former employer at a security agency, who offers him RM3,000 for a 2-day and 1-night job as security guard at a soon-to-be shut down shopping complex building. Maniam, the former Head of Security, gives Surya a tour in the building and tells him that the most suspicious and dangerous place he should avoid is the sixth floor, which is currently rented by a religious yoga group led by `Swamiji` (priest). They are up to no good as they plan to summon and trap spirits in dead bodies so that they can control them. When the door to the spirit world is opened, dozens are possessed and turned into flesh eating Zombies. The only way to stop the Zombies is to get the Black Magic Book located on the sixth floor.

Cast
 Denes Kumar
 Jasmine Michael
 Sai Prashanth
 Janani Balu
 Magendran "Vikadakavi" Raman
 Prakash
 Alvin Martin
 Thinagaran (Thiran)
 Kristina Vinokree, 
 Farah Hanim

Soundtrack
The soundtrack composed by Daddy Shaq

See also
 Malaysian Tamil cinema

References

External links 
 

2015 films
2015 comedy horror films
Malaysian comedy horror films
2010s Tamil-language films
Tamil-language Malaysian films
Tamil diaspora in Malaysia
Zombie comedy films